Surat Singh Khalsa (born 7 March 1933), also known as "Bapu Surat Singh Khalsa" is a civil rights and political activist, from the Indian state of Punjab.  Surat Singh Khalsa has been involved with various political struggles related to Sikhs in Punjab, however he is currently in the limelight for a hunger strike as a form of peaceful protest against illegal and prolonged detention of political prisoners.

Hunger Strike
On 16 January 2015, Surat Singh Khalsa began a hunger strike which is still ongoing. He has refused food and water to seek the release of Sikh political prisoners who have completed their court sentences.  Where he is seeking release of Sikh political prisoners, he has also called for unconditional release of prisoners of all religions who have completed their terms.

On 11 February 2015, Surat Singh Khalsa wrote an open letter to Prime Minister Narendra Modi explaining the motive of his hunger strike.  In his letter, Surat Singh Khalsa summed up his demands in two points
 Treat all Sikh prisoners –under trials and those sentenced in cases relating to the Sikh struggle- as political prisoners and
 Release all prisoners who have completed their full jail terms and are legitimately due for release, exactly in the same manner, as other prisoners are so released in various other parts of the country.

A number of Sikh Political Prisoners are languishing in jails despite having completed their sentences.  Many of these prisoners are released on parole on yearly basis.  These prisoners can be granted permanent parole or be released on bail as there are no pending charges against them.  In addition, Surat Singh Khalsa is seeking release of senior citizens based on humanitarian grounds.  There are at least 8 such prisoners who have been sentenced under the Terrorist and Disruptive Activities (Prevention) Act for their involvement in a bank robbery case that took place in Ludhiana. This law has already lapsed and has been deemed as controversial by human rights organizations, as well as the United Nations.

On 5 December 2015, a viral video began circulating showing a man purported to be Khalsa eating a number of items while in a hospital setting. However Khalsa rejected this report claiming it was ploy to distract from his strike, and in response Khalsa also gave up drinking water in further protest.  However, during an interview given to the Indian Express, his son accepted that he did consume that food, although due to the drugs the doctors had given him.

Formal Detentions
On 26 February 2015, Surat Singh Khalsa and his son, Ravinder Jeet Singh, a US citizen, were arrested in Ludhiana, Punjab (India) under "preventive charges". At time of his arrest, Surat Singh Khalsa was peacefully protesting for release of Sikh political prisoners who have completed their terms.  His son, Ravinder Jeet was merely accompanying his father at a hospital in Ludhiana (Punjab, India) when they were both arrested.  In addition, Surinder Singh of Talking Punjab and others were also detained for brief periods. After intervention of the President of India and alleged pressure by various US Congressman, Surat Singh Khalsa and Ravinder Jeet Singh were released.

Before his formal detention, Surat Singh Khalsa was picked up from his residence in Hassanpur on 8 February 2015, where he had commenced his hunger strike.  His arrest was informal, without any charges. He was taken to the Civil Hospital in Ludhiana.  Until 26 February 2015, family members and supporters continued to visit him, however later the police turned the informal detention to a virtual arrest, turning the hospital into a police station.

After being released on 23 April 2015, he was once again picked up on 1 June and detained at the Ludhiana's DMC Hero Heart Hospital for 18 days.  On 18 June, he was transferred to Chandigarh's PGI Hospital and kept there until 22 June when he was released and allowed to return to his Hassanpur residence.

Again, on 20 July, he was taken into custody at Ludhiana's Civil Hospital on 20 July, and kept there for 3 days to be later transferred to the DMC Hero Heart Hospital once again on 22 July until 15 August, for 12 days.

Lifelong political activism
Surat Singh Khalsa has been involved with human rights activism since early 1970s.  Ever since being initiated as a Khalsa in 1972 in Bombay, India, Surat Singh Khalsa has advocated human rights, and spoke out against injustices to Sikhs and other minorities living in India.  During the Dharam Yudh Morcha (a political movement launched by the Sikhs for equal rights) of 1980's, he served as an adviser.

He resigned his post as government teacher on 5 June 1984 in the aftermath of Operation Bluestar in June 1984.  Continuing with his advocacy for human rights, he served as the secretary of the United Akali Dal under the leadership of Baba Joginder Singh Rode (father of Sant Jarnail Singh Khalsa Bhindranwale).  He remained active in the UAD until late 1987.  During a protest rally at Punjab Legislative Assembly in February 1986, an unprovoked police firing resulted in Surat Singh Khalsa being hit by a bullet on his legs.  He continued to remain politically active and has been detained in various jails, including Chandigarh, Nabha, Patiala and Amritsar in Punjab, as well as Kurukshetra, Rohtak and Ambala in Haryana during 1980s.

He immigrated to the US and became a Green Card holder in 1988.  All children (five daughters and a son) are US nationals.  He continued to remain active towards Sikh political issues and continued travelling to Punjab from the USA frequently.

After Amb Sahib Morcha of November 2013 and Lakhnaur Sahib campaign in November 2014, Surat Singh Khalsa decided to stand up for those detained unconstitutionally.  During the first campaign for the release of Sikh political prisoners, Surat Singh Khalsa had announced that if anything was to happen to Bhai Gurbaksh Singh Khalsa, he would personally under indefinite fast-onto-death until Sikh political prisoners were released.  When Bhai Gurbaksh Singh had commenced his 2nd hunger strike, Surat Singh Khalsa traveled to Punjab from USA to express his support.  However, after the conclusion of the second hunger strike as well by Bhai Gurbaksh Singh, Surat Singh Khalsa announced to undergo hunger strike in place of Bhai Gurbaksh Singh.

Anna Hazare's Anti-Corruption Agitation
In the first Anna Hazare anti-corruption agitation in New Delhi, when Hazare was on hunger strike fast from 05/04/2011 to 09/04/2011, Surat Singh Khalsa also remained on fast in Ludhiana in support of the anti-corruption drive.  The Tribune, labelled Surat Singh Khalsa as the "Anna Hazare of Punjab".

Assassination of son-in-law
On 16 August 2015, at 11:45 PM, Satwinder Singh Bhola, son-in-law was killed under mysterious circumstances.  Investigations are still going on, while local officials have ruled out possibility of robbery. Even though he was murdered shortly after locking up his shop and had $2000 in his pocket after death. Many organizations have claimed that he was murdered to stop the protest of Surat Singh Khalsa.

References

1933 births
Living people
Indian civil rights activists
Indian Sikhs
People from Ludhiana
Activists from Punjab, India
Hunger strikers